Devil's Lair is a single-chamber cave with a floor area of around  that formed in a Quaternary dune limestone of the Leeuwin–Naturaliste Ridge,  from the modern coastline of Western Australia. Excavations have been made in several areas of the cave floor. Since 1973, excavations have been concentrated in the middle (approximately on a north-west, south-east axis) of the cave, where 10 trenches have been dug. The site provides evidence of human habitation of Southwest Australia 50,000 years before the present day.

Excavations
Devil's Lair has been the subject of scientific research since the 1970s by palaeontologists and archaeologists. Excavations have recovered stone artefacts, numerous animal bone remains, hearths, bone artefacts and human skeletal remains.

Preservation of cultural materials has been very good and a long, well dated cultural sequence has been documented. The diversity and productiveness of the evidence from Devil's Lair make it unusually valuable as a source of information on cultural and natural history in the extreme southwest of Australia since the first colonisation of the continent.

The site is named for the remains of the locally extinct Sarcophilus harrisii uncovered there, their own bones and those of the animals they had fractured when consuming them at the site; the species was known by the remaining population that is referred to as the Tasmanian devil. The earliest palaeontological examination at the site was undertaken by E. L. Lundelius in 1955, then an American Fulbright scholar researching mammalian Pleistocene fauna in Western Australia. A review of tooth specimens of kangaroo species collected at the site discovered a human tooth was included and the archaeological significance of Devil's Lair prompted intense interest in that field.

Archaeological significance
Devil's Lair is important as one of the earliest sites of human occupation in Australia, a site with very early human ornaments and an unusually rich source of information for prehistoric cultural and natural history in the southwest of Western Australia.

Dating
Several different techniques of dating have been used at Devil's Lair to show that human occupation began at around 48,000 years. This makes it rank among the earliest sites in Australia and so an important source of information about the timing and character of the first human colonizers of Australia.

Excavations at Devil's Lair have yielded early human ornaments in the form of three ground bone beads dating to 19,000–12,700 years BP. These beads were made from the limb-bones of macropods and were manufactured by cutting the bone shafts into short segments and grinding them smooth on abrasive stone. A deliberately perforated but otherwise unmodified stone object with wear patterns suggestive of its use as a pendant dated to 14,000 year BP has also been recovered from Devil's Lair.

These artefacts are some of the earliest evidence of symbolic behaviour in Australia and are internationally significant for understanding the timing and character of the emergence of symbolic capacities in humans.

References

Archaeological sites in Western Australia
Pleistocene paleontological sites of Australia
Caves of Western Australia
Leeuwin-Naturaliste National Park
Paleoanthropological sites